The German Air Force is the aerial warfare branch of the , the armed forces of Germany. The German Air Force (as part of the Bundeswehr) was founded in 1956 during the era of the Cold War as the aerial warfare branch of the armed forces of then West Germany. After the reunification of West and East Germany in 1990, it integrated parts of the air force of the former German Democratic Republic, which itself had been founded in 1956 as part of the National People's Army. There is no organizational continuity between the current German Air Force and the former Luftwaffe of the Wehrmacht founded in 1935, which was completely disbanded in 1945/46 after World War II. The term  that is used for both the historic and the current German air force is the German-language generic designation of any air force.

The commander of the German Air Force is Lieutenant General Ingo Gerhartz. As of 2015, the German Air Force uses eleven air bases, two of which host no flying units. Furthermore, the Air Force has a presence at three civil airports. In 2012, the German Air Force had an authorized strength of 28,475 active airmen and 4,914 reservists.

History

After World War II, German aviation was severely curtailed, and military aviation was completely forbidden after the Allied Control Commission disbanded the Nazi-era  in August 1946. This changed in 1955 when West Germany joined NATO, as the Western Allies believed that Germany was needed to counter the increasing military threat posed by the Soviet Union and its Warsaw Pact allies. Therefore, on 9 January 1956, a new German Air Force called  was founded as a branch of the new .

Many well-known fighter pilots of the s  joined the new post-war air force and underwent refresher training in the US before returning to West Germany to upgrade on the latest U.S.-supplied hardware. These included Erich Hartmann, Gerhard Barkhorn, Günther Rall and Johannes Steinhoff. Another pilot of World War II, Josef Kammhuber, also made a significant career in the post-war , retiring in 1962 as Chief Inspector of the Air Force.

Despite the partial reliance of the new air force on airmen who had served in the 's air arm, there was no organizational continuity between the old and the new .

First years
The first volunteers of the  arrived at the Nörvenich Air Base in January 1956.

In 1957, the  took command of the Army Air Defence Troops located in Rendsburg and began the expansion of its own air defense missile capabilities. The first squadron to be declared operational was the Air Transport Wing 61 at Erding Air Base, followed by the 31st Fighter-Bomber Squadron at Büchel Air Base. In 1958, the  received its first conscripts. In 1959, the  declared the 11th Missile Group in Kaufbeuren armed with MGM-1 Matador surface-to-surface tactical nuclear cruise missiles operational. The same year Fighter Wing 71 equipped with Canadair CL-13 fighters became operational at Ahlhorner Heide Air Base. All aircraft sported—and continue to sport—the Iron Cross on the fuselage, harking back to the pre-March 1918 days of World War I, while the national flag of West Germany is displayed on the tail.

Cold War

In 1963, the  saw its first major reorganization. The two operational Air Force Group Commands – Command North and Command South were both split into two mixed Air Force divisions containing flying and air defense units and one Support division. Additionally, a 7th Air Force division was raised in Schleswig-Holstein containing flying units, missile units, support units, and the German Navy's naval aviation and placed under command of Allied Forces Baltic Approaches.

In 1960, the  received its first Lockheed F-104 Starfighter jets. The Starfighter remained in service for the entire duration of the Cold War, with the last being taken out of service in 1991. The  received 916 Starfighters, 292 of which crashed, resulting in the deaths of 116 pilots. The disastrous service record of the Starfighter led to the Starfighter crisis in 1966 as a reaction to 27 Starfighter crashes with 17 casualties in 1965 alone.

On 25 August 1966, the German Defence Minister Kai-Uwe von Hassel relieved the Chief Inspector of the Air Force Generalleutnant Werner Panitzki, and transferred Colonel Erich Hartmann, commanding officer of the 71st Fighter Squadron, as both had publicly criticized the acquisition of the Starfighter as a "purely political decision". On 2 September 1966, Johannes Steinhoff, with Günther Rall as deputy, became the new Chief Inspector of the Air Force. Steinhoff and his deputy Günther Rall noted that the non-German F-104s proved much safer. The Americans blamed the high loss rate of the  F-104s on the extremely low-level and aggressive flying of German pilots rather than any faults in the aircraft. Steinhoff and Rall went to America to learn to fly the Starfighter under Lockheed instruction and noted some specifics in the training (a lack of mountain and foggy-weather training), combined with handling capabilities (rapidly initiated, high G turns) of the aircraft that could cause accidents. Steinhoff and Rall, therefore, changed the training regimen for the F-104 pilots, and the accident rates fell to those comparable or better than other air forces.

On Steinhoff's initiative, the  opened the German Air Force Command USA/Canada in Fort Bliss, where the  trained its missile and air defense troops, and pilots received their basic training. At the same time, the  opened a Tactical Training Command in Beja, Portugal, where pilots were trained in Close Air Support missions.

Between 1967 and 1970, the  undertook a major reorganization of its forces. The two operational commands were disbanded and the four mixed Air Force divisions were divided into two flying divisions and two air defense divisions. The remainder of the units were divided into functional commands:
 Air Force Operation Command, with the signal regiments, the radar, and the signals intelligence units
 Air Force Training Command, with the schools and training regiments
 Air Force Support Command, with all logistical, maintenance, and repair units, and the Material Office of the Air Force
 Air Force Transport Command, with the air transport squadrons.

Over the next decade, the  received large amounts of new equipment, including in 1968 the first C-160 Transall transport planes, in 1974 the F-4 Phantom II fighter-bombers, in 1978 the first Alpha Jet Version A light attack jets and in 1979 the first of 212 Panavia Tornado fighters.

In 1986, the air defense forces began to replace their Nike Hercules missile systems with state-of-the-art surface-to-air missile systems: first to arrive was the MIM-104 Patriot system, followed one year later by Roland short-range missile system.

Nuclear sharing 
Germany is participating in NATO's nuclear sharing concept. Nuclear sharing is a concept that involves member countries without nuclear weapons of their own in the planning for the use of nuclear weapons by NATO, and in particular, provides for the armed forces of these countries to be involved in delivering these weapons in the event of their use.

Soon after its founding, the German Air Force began to train with the US Seventeenth Air Force in handling, arming, and delivering nuclear weapons. At first, the F-104 Starfighter was intended to be used solely as a nuclear delivery platform, armed with nuclear air-to-air and air-to-surface missiles, as well as nuclear bombs. The Tornado was the second air force plane fielded that was capable of delivering nuclear ammunition, although it was limited to delivering B61 nuclear bombs.

From 1965 through 1970, Missile Wings 1 and 2 fielded 16 Pershing 1 missile systems with nuclear warheads under U.S. Army custody. In 1970, the system was upgraded to Pershing 1a with 72 missiles. Although not directly affected by the 1988 Intermediate-Range Nuclear Forces Treaty, the  unilaterally removed the Pershing 1a missiles from its inventory in 1991, and the missiles were destroyed.

The United States still lends nuclear weapons for hypothetical use by the  under the nuclear sharing agreement. In 2007, 22 B61 nuclear bombs were still kept in Germany, stored at the Büchel Air Base for use with Tornado IDS fighter-bombers of the Tactical Air Force Wing 33. The American nuclear weapons formerly stored at Nörvenich Air Base, Ramstein Air Base, and Memmingen Air Base were all withdrawn from Germany during the mid-and-late-1990s.

By international treaties between Germany and the "Big Four" powers in Europe (that formerly occupied Germany), East Germany was a nuclear-free zone. The Big Four powers are the United States, Russia, the United Kingdom, and France, and the latter three have no nuclear weapons in Germany anymore.

Reunification

The remnants of the East German Air Force were placed under the newly formed 5th Air Force Division in Strausberg. In 1993, the division was renamed 3rd Air Force Division, moved to Gatow in Berlin and in 1995 assigned to NATO. By 1990, the East German plane markings had been replaced by the Air Force Iron Cross, the first time Soviet-built aircraft had served in a NATO air force. However, as the Luftstreitkräfte der NVA were supplied exclusively with Eastern Bloc-produced aircraft, such as the Sukhoi Su-17, MiG-21, MiG-23 and MiG-29 fighters, most of the equipment was not compatible with the West German NATO equipment and therefore taken out of service and sold or given to new members of NATO in Eastern Europe, such as Poland and the Baltic states.

An exception to this was the Fighter Wing 3 "Vladimir Komarov " in Preschen Air Base. The Fighter Wing 3 flew brand new MiG-29 fighters. On 1 June 1993, the wing was renamed Fighter Wing 73 and on 1 October 1994 completed its move to its new home at Laage Air Base. The pilots of JG 73 were some of the most experienced MiG-29 pilots in the world. One of their primary duties was to serve as aggressor pilots, training other pilots in dissimilar combat tactics. The United States sent a group of fighter pilots to Germany during the Red October exercise to practice tactics against the aircraft they were most likely to meet in real combat. The MiG-29s of JG 73 were fully integrated into the 's air defence structure and the first Soviet Bloc aircraft to be declared operational within NATO. With the introduction of the Eurofighter Typhoon imminent, the decision was taken to withdraw the MiG-29. All German MiG-29s, save one, were sold to Poland for the symbolic price of €1 apiece. On 9 August 2004, the last MiG-29s landed in Poland where they continue to serve in the 41st Tactical Squadron of the Polish Air Force.

Operations in the Balkans

The  experienced combat action for the first time since World War II during September 1995 in the course of Operation Deliberate Force, when six IDS Tornado fighter-bombers, equipped with forward looking infrared devices, and escorted by eight ECR Tornados, supported NATO's artillery missions on positions of the Bosnian Serbs around Sarajevo, Bosnia & Herzegovina.

In March 1999, the  became involved in a direct combat role as part of the Kosovo War along with the other NATO powers. This event was noted as significant in the British press with The Sun running the headline " and the RAF into battle side by side". The  sent in Fighter Bomber Wing 32, equipped with ECR Tornados, which flew missions to suppress enemy air defenses in and around Kosovo.

These fighter-bombers were equipped with an electronic countermeasures pod, one AIM-9 Sidewinder air-to-air missile for self-defence, and an AGM-88 HARM air-to-ground missile (anti-radar). The bomber wing flew 2108 hours and 446 sorties, firing 236 HARM missiles at hostile targets. No manned  planes were lost in combat during this campaign.

2000s
In 2005 and 2008,  F-4F Phantom II fighter planes took part in the Baltic Air Policing operation (of NATO), and these fighters were supplemented in 2009 by units flying the Typhoon.

In 2006, to support military operations in Afghanistan, the  sent over several Panavia Tornado reconnaissance planes from the 51st Reconnaissance Wing "Immelmann", stationed in Mazar-i-Sharif, Northern Afghanistan.
There have also been assorted German Army helicopters flying from the  Air Base in Mazar-i-Sharif. Also,  C-160 Transall have flown transport plane missions in and around Afghanistan.

On 13 January 2004, the Minister of Defence, Peter Struck, announced major changes in the future of the German armed forces. A major part of this announcement was a plan to cut the number of fighter planes from 426 in early 2004, to 265 by 2015. Assuming that the plans to order 180 Typhoons is carried out in full, and all of the F-4 Phantoms are removed from service, this would cut the number of Tornado fighter-bombers down to just 85.

In the past, the Bundesmarine's naval air wing received 112 Tornado IDS planes. However, in late 2004, the last unit of Bundesmarine Tornados was disbanded.

2010s

As of 2014, a significant proportion of Germany's military aircraft was reported to be unserviceable. It was reported that around half of the Eurofighters and Tornados were not currently airworthy and that the aging C-160 fleet remained in limited service while awaiting the introduction of the Airbus A400M, the first of which was delivered in December 2014. Ursula von der Leyen admitted that, due to the poor state of the 's equipment, Germany was no longer able to fulfill its NATO commitments.

The German Air Force was one of the founding members of the European Air Transport Command headquartered in Eindhoven - The Netherlands and most of the Transport & Tanker assets have been transferred under EATC management. The replacement of four Airbus A310 MRTT by the Airbus A330 MRTT was approved in 2018 by joining the acquisition of four by the Royal Netherlands Air Force.

Future plans are the replacement of the aging Sikorsky CH-53 Sea Stallion, which was acquired in the 1970s, by Boeing CH-47 Chinook or Sikorsky CH-53K King Stallion. A bid for a heavy transport helicopter program or STH was initiated in 2018. However, the award was suspended in 2020 due to the high price tag on both helicopters.

The  participated in the Israeli Air Force exercise "Blue Flag", the country's largest international air combat exercise, designed to simulate extreme combat scenarios. The German Air Force's six Eurofighter Typhoon fighter jets were from Tactical Air Force Squadron 73 Steinhoff from Rostock. It is the first German participation in the Blue Flag exercise.

In 2018, the Air Force issued a request for information from manufacturers about four potential aircraft to replace the aging Panavia Tornados - the Eurofighter Typhoon, F-15 Advanced Eagle, F/A-18E/F Super Hornet and F-35 Lightning. In January 2019, it was announced that the F-35 Lightning had been dropped from the shortlist, with the Eurofighter Typhoon and Boeing F/A-18 Super Hornet under consideration.

The German Air Force will acquire three C-130J Super Hercules Transport and three KC-130J Tanker Aircraft (delivery planned 2020–2021), which will be jointly operated with the French Air Force's two C-130J and two KC-130J Aircraft (delivery planned 2018–2019).

2020s

In April 2020, the German government announced its intention to gain approval for the purchase of 30 Boeing F/A-18E/F Super Hornets, 15 EA-18G Growlers, and 55 Eurofighter Typhoons as replacements for the Tornado fleet. However, as of the same month such approval was unlikely to occur before 2022. The Super Hornet was selected due to its compatibility with nuclear weapons and availability of an electronic attack version. As of March 2022, the Super Hornet has not been certified for the B61 Mod 12 nuclear bombs, but Dan Gillian, head of Boeing's Super Hornet program, previously stated that "We certainly think that we, working with the U.S. government, can meet the German requirements there on the [German's] timeline."

In December 2021, Air Transport Wing 63 in Hohn Air Base and with it, the last remaining German C-160 Transalls were disbanded, with the A400M and C-130J serving as the German tactical transport aircraft in the future.

In March 2022, German Minister of Defence Christine Lambrecht announced that Germany intends to buy 35 Lockheed Martin F-35 Lightning II fighter jets instead of Super Hornets to replace the Tornado, the only aircraft Germany possess capable of carrying US nuclear weapons. Germany intends to also order 15 Eurofighter Typhoon electronic warfare aircraft in place of Growlers.

In April 2022, as a continuation of the STH program, Germany has chosen the CH-47F Chinook to replace its aging fleet of Sikorsky CH-53 Sea Stallion.

In August 2022, Germany sent six Eurofighter Typhoon fighter jets, three Airbus A330 MRTT tankers and four Airbus A400M Atlas transports to take part in Exercise Pitch Black in Australia, in the air force's largest peacetime deployment.

Structure

The current commander of the German Air Force is Lieutenant General Ingo Gerhartz. The Inspector of the Air Force is the commander of Air Force Command, a body created in 2013 by the merger of the Air Force Office, German Air Staff, and Air Force Forces Command. Similar to the Air Staff of the United States Air Force, the German Air Force Command is a force-providing command, not an operational command. The Air Force command directly controls three higher commands.

In addition to the higher command authorities, the three air divisions, the Air Force Training Command, and Air Force Weapon Systems Command were disbanded. The three surface-to-air missile units will merge into a single wing in Husum in Northern Germany. The wing fields 14 MIM-104 Patriot and 4 MANTIS systems. The three air transport wings will be merged into a single wing based at Wunstorf Air Base, which will field 40 A400M Atlas transport planes. The  will field three Multirole Eurofighter Wings, each with two squadrons for a total of 143 Eurofighter Typhoon. A fighter-bomber wing fielding Panavia Tornado IDS planes remains in service at Büchel Air Base. The Reconnaissance Wing 51 will remain in service at Schleswig Air Base and add one drone squadron to its Panavia Tornado ECR squadron.

The  has two main elements subordinate to it:
 Air Operations Command, responsible for providing command and control to air operations
 Air Force Forces Command

Individual Air Force units are either part of the Air Force Operational Forces Command or the Support Forces Command. They only fall under the command of the Air Operations Command when on deployment or attached to EU or NATO organizations.

Air Operations Command 

The main subordinate elements of the Air Operations Command are:
 Air Operations Center (NATO CAOC Uedem), in Uedem, responsible for NATO's Integrated Air Defense System North of the Alps
 Air Force Support Group, in Kalkar
 Control and Reporting Center 2, in Erndtebrück
 Operations Squadron 21, in Erndtebrück
 Operations Support Squadron 22, in Erndtebrück
 Sensor Platoon I, in Lauda
 Remote Radar Post 240 "Loneship", in Erndtebrück with GM 406F
 Remote Radar Post 246 "Hardwheel", on Erbeskopf with HADR
 Remote Radar Post 247 "Batman", in Lauda with GM 406F
 Remote Radar Post 248 "Coldtrack", in Freising with GM 406F
 Remote Radar Post 249 "Sweet Apple", in Meßstetten with HADR
 Sensor Platoon II, in Auenhausen
 Remote Radar Post 241 "Crabtree", in Marienbaum with Hughes HR-3000
 Remote Radar Post 242 "Backwash", in Auenhausen with GM 406F
 Remote Radar Post 243 "Silver Cork", in Visselhövede with GM 406F
 Remote Radar Post 244 "Round up", in Brockzetel with HADR
 Remote Radar Post 245 "Bugle", in Brekendorf with GM 406F
 Control and Reporting Training Inspection 23, in Erndtebrück
 Education and Training Center, in Erndtebrück
 Education, Test and Training Group, in Erndtebrück
 Control and Reporting Center 3, in Schönewalde
 Operations Squadron 31, in Schönewalde
 Operations Support Squadron 32, in Schönewalde
 Sensor Platoon III, in Cölpin
 Remote Radar Post 351 "Matchpoint", in Putgarten with RRP-117
 Remote Radar Post 352 "Mindreader", in Cölpin with RRP-117
 Remote Radar Post 353 "Teddy Bear", in Tempelhof with RRP-117
 Remote Radar Post 356 "", in Elmenhorst with RRP-117
 Sensor Platoon IV, in Regen
 Remote Radar Post 354 "Blackmoor", in Döbern with RRP-117
 Remote Radar Post 355 "Royal Flash", in Gleina with RRP-117
 Remote Radar Post 357 "", on Döbraberg with RRP-117
 Remote Radar Post 358 "Snow Cap", on Großer Arber with RRP-117
 Deployable Control and Reporting Centre, in Schönewalde
 Air Force Command Support Center, in Köln-Wahn
 German Representation at NATO's Allied Air Command, at Ramstein Air Base
 German Representation at Joint Air Power Competence Centre, in Kalkar
 German Representation at European Air Transport Command, in Eindhoven Air Base
 German Representation at NATO Airborne Early Warning & Control Force Command, at NATO Air Base Geilenkirchen
 German Representation at Alliance Ground Surveillance, in Sigonella Air Base

Air Force Forces Command 
The main subordinate elements of the Air Force Operational Forces Command are:

Directly subordinated institutions:
 Air Force Air and Space Medicine Center, at Köln-Wahn Air Base

Subordinated flying units:
 Tactical Air Force Wing 31 "Boelcke", at Nörvenich Air Base, with Eurofighter Typhoon
 Tactical Air Force Wing 33, at Büchel Air Base, with Tornado IDS
 Tactical Air Force Wing 51 "Immelmann", at Schleswig Air Base, with Tornado IDS/ECR
Tornado flight training returned from Holloman AFB, USA to Schleswig-Jagel as a squadron under the Immelmann Wing
 Tactical Air Force Wing 71 "Richthofen", at Wittmundhafen Air Base, with Eurofighter Typhoon
 Tactical Air Force Wing 73 "Steinhoff", at Laage Air Base, with Eurofighter Typhoon (Typhoon OCU)
 Tactical Air Force Wing 74, at Neuburg Air Base, with Eurofighter Typhoon
 Air Transport Wing 62, at Wunstorf Air Base with A400M Atlas
Helicopter Wing 64, at Laupheim Air Base and Holzdorf Air Base
 Flying Group, at Laupheim Air Base with CH-53 Sea Stallion and H145M LUH SOF
 Air Transport Group, at Holzdorf Air Base with CH-53 Sea Stallion
Executive Transport Wing, at Köln-Wahn Airport
1st Air Transport Squadron at Köln-Wahn Airport with Airbus A330 MRTT
2nd Air Transport Squadron at Köln-Wahn Airport with A340-300 VIP, Airbus A321, A319CJ, Global 5000 and 
3rd Air Transport Squadron at Berlin-Tegel Airport with AS532 U2 Cougar
 Air Force Tactical Training Command USA, Holloman AFB, New Mexico
 German Representation at Euro NATO Joint Jet Pilot Training, Sheppard AFB, Texas with T-6 Texan II and T-38C Talon
 German Air Force Training Squadron 2, at NAS Pensacola, Florida
 German Air Force Training Squadron 3, at Phoenix Goodyear Airport, Arizona
 Electronic Warfare Flying Weapon Systems Center, in Kleinaitingen

Subordinated ground based units:
 Air Defence Missile Wing 1 "Schleswig-Holstein", in Husum Air Base
 Air Defence Missile Group 21, in Sanitz and Prangendorf with MIM-104 Patriot
 Air Defence Missile Group 24, in Bad Sülze with MIM-104 Patriot
 Air Defence Missile Group 26, in Husum Air Base with MIM-104 Patriot
 Air Defence Missile Group 61, in Todendorf with MANTIS (part of the Royal Netherlands Army's Joint Ground-based Air Defence Command since April 2018)
 Air Defence Missiles Tactical Training and Instruction Center, in Fort Bliss, Texas
 Air Defence Missiles Training Center, in Husum
 Air Force Regiment "Friesland", at Jever Air Base
 Battalion I (Infantry), at Jever Air Base
 Battalion II (Logistics, Sappers, Firefighters), at Diepholz Air Base
 Air Force Officer School, in Fürstenfeldbruck
 Air Force Non-Commissioned Officer School, in Appen and Heide
 Air Force Training Battalion, in Germersheim
 Air Force Support Group, at Köln-Wahn Air Base

Subordinated support units:
 Weapon System Support Center 1, at Erding Air Base
 Maintenance Center 11, at Erding Air Base
 Maintenance Center 12, in Ummendorf
 Maintenance Center 13, at Landsberg/Lech Air Base
 Maintenance Center 14, at Ingolstadt/Manching Air Base
 Weapon System Support Center 2, at Diepholz Air Base
 Maintenance Center 21, at Diepholz Air Base (will move to Holzdorf Air Base)
 Maintenance Center 23, at Wunstorf Air Base
 Maintenance Center 24, at Trollenhagen Air Base (will move to Laage Air Base)
 Maintenance Center 25, in Erndtebrück
 Maintenance Center 26, at Wunstorf Air Base
 Air Force Technical Training Center, at Faßberg Air Base
 Air Force Technical Training Center North, at Faßberg Air Base
 Air Force Technical Training Center South, at Kaufbeuren Air Base
 Air Force Professional College, at Faßberg Air Base
 German Representation at the NATO Programming Center, in Glons, Belgium

North American training centers

In light of the destroyed infrastructure of West Germany post–World War II, the restrictions on aircraft production placed on Germany and the later restrictive flying zones available for training pilots, the reconstructed  trained most of its pilots tactically away from Germany, mainly in the United States and Canada where most of its aircraft were sourced.

During the 1960s and 1970s, a very large number of  jet crashes—the  suffered a 36 percent crash rate for F-84F Thunderstreaks and an almost 30 percent loss of F-104 Starfighters—created considerable public demand for moving  combat training centers away from Germany.

As a result, the  set up two tactical training centers: one, like those of many of the NATO forces, at the Royal Canadian Air Force base at Goose Bay; and the second in a unique partnership with the United States Air Force at Holloman Air Force Base in New Mexico (F-104 pilots had already been trained at Luke Air Force Base, Arizona, since 1964). Both facilities provide access to large unpopulated areas, where tactical and combat training can take place without danger to large populations.

On 1 May 1996, the  established the German Air Force Tactical Training Center (TTC) in concert with the United States Air Force 20th Fighter Squadron at Holloman Air Force Base in New Mexico, which provides aircrew training in the F-4F Phantom II. The TTC serves as the parent command for two German aircrew training squadrons. The F-4 Training Squadron oversees all German F-4 student personnel affairs and provides German instructor pilots to cooperate in the contracted F-4 training program provided by the U.S. Air Force (20th Fighter Squadron). A second TTC unit, the Tornado Training Squadron, provides academic and tactical flying training, by German air force instructors, for German Tornado aircrews.

The first contingent of Tornado aircraft arrived at Holloman in March 1996. More than 300 German air force personnel are permanently assigned at Holloman to the TTC, the only unit of its kind in the United States. The German Air Force Flying Training Center was activated on 31 March 1996, with German Air Force Chief of Staff Gen. Portz and U.S. Air Force Chief of Staff Gen. Michael Ryan present. The  has since stationed up to 800 personnel at Holloman for training exercises, due to limited training space in Europe.

In September 2004, the  announced a reduction in its training program by about 20%. By the end of 2006, 650  personnel and 25 Tornado aircraft were assigned to Holloman.

Air bases
In 2020, the Air Force uses 12 air bases, four of which host no flying units. In the future, Lechfeld Air Base will become home to a second A400M wing of the German Air Force. This was planned to be a German-led multinational wing for NATO partners but was canceled in March 2022 due to little interest and cost. Furthermore, the Air Force has a presence at three civilian airports incl. the Airport Berlin Tegel which has been closed in November 2020:

Personnel
In 2012, the Air Force had an authorized strength of 44,565 active airmen/women and 4,914 reservists. The civil personnel within the Air Force is being reduced to 5,950 officials and employees. Most of the civilian employees work in maintenance and the Air Force Fire Department. On 20 September 2011 defense minister Thomas de Maizière announced that the Air Force would shrink to 23,000 airmen/women.

Training 

Symbols, emblems and uniform

Roundel and serial number

Originally German Air Force aircraft carried an Iron Cross—appearing to be closely modeled on that used by the 1916-17 era Imperial German  through the spring of 1918, but no longer have the white border around the crosses' "ends" (thusly resembling the orthogonal white "flanks" of the earlier, 1918-1945 era  national marking)—as an identifying feature on all four wing positions and on both sides on the rear of the fuselage and a small tricolor German flag painted on the vertical stabilizer. Each aircraft also carried a serial number consisting of two letters, which identified the service and combat wing, followed by three numbers identifying the squadron and the number of the plane within the squadron, almost graphically resembling the USAF's own buzz numbers of the same period.

This system was changed in 1968. The large Iron Cross and serial numbers have since been replaced on all aircraft by a four-number registration code, appearing somewhat in the manner of the earlier alphanumeric  combat wing code characters used by their World War II predecessor—separated by an Iron Cross in the middle: the first two numbers identify the type of aircraft and the second two numbers are sequential for each type. When writing the registration number the Iron Cross is written as a "+". I.e. the Tornado IDS of the Air Force are numbered from 43+01 to 46+22, while the Tornado ECR of the Air Force is numbered from 46+23 to 46+57. The numbers from 30+01 to 33+99 are being used for the Eurofighter.

Uniform 
The ranks of the Air Force are identical to the ranks of the German Army. The Air Force field dress is the same as the army field dress. The dress uniform of the Air Force is dark blue with gold-yellow wings as collar patches. As headdress a dark blue side cap or dark blue peaked cap can be worn. Members of the German Air Force Regiment wear a dark blue beret.

Aircraft

Current inventory 

NOTE: Germany is participating in the MRTT program for their aerial refueling needs, along with contracting NHV to provide H145 rotorcraft training

See also

 Luftstreitkräfte der NVA
 Glossary of German military terms
 Kommando LSK/LV
 List of military aircraft of Germany
 Luftwaffenmuseum, Berlin

References

Further reading 
Hundreds of books, magazines and articles have been written about the Luftwaffe. A select few are listed here.
 Amadio, Jill (2002), Günther Rall: A Memoir, Seven Locks Press. .
 Philpott, Bryan (1986), History of the German Air Force, Hamlyn. .

External links 

  
 Luftwaffe museum 
 Fleet of Luftwaffe

 
Air forces by country
Bundeswehr
German military aviation